Cotten is a surname. Notable people with the surname include:

Ann Cotten (born 1982), American-born Austrian writer
Elizabeth Cotten (1893–1987), American musician and singer-songwriter
Gerald Cotten (1988-2018), Canadian CEO of bankrupt cryptocurrency exchange Quadriga Fintech Solutions
James Cotten (born 1974), American actor, film director, producer and writer
Joanna Cotten, American country music singer
Joni Cotten (born 1953), American curler
Joseph Cotten (1905–1994), American actor
Lyman A. Cotten (1874–1926), American naval officer
USS Cotten, warship named after him
Mike Cotten (born 1939), American football player
Sallie Southall Cotten (1846–1929), American writer and clubwoman
SS Sallie S. Cotten, Liberty ship named after her
Sonia Cotten (born 1974), Canadian writer

See also
Cotton (surname)